Marumba jankowskii is a species of moth of the family Sphingidae first described by Charles Oberthür in 1880. It is known from south-eastern Russian Far East, north-eastern China, North Korea, South Korea and Japan.

The wingspan is 68–80 mm. It is similar to Marumba maackii, but the hindwing upperside costal and distal areas are not yellow. Adults are on wing from early June to late August in Korea.

The larvae feed on Tilia species, including T. mandshurica.

The species is named after the collector Michał Jankowski.

References

Marumba
Moths described in 1880
Moths of Japan